Lake Cabana is an ancient lake in the Altiplano.

The Capalla-Ulloma sill, which separates the Altiplano into a northern and southern basin, did not exist at that time and it did not split up the Cabana lake body. Erosion platforms and terraces covered with gravels and other wave cut structures are remnants of Lake Cabana.

In 1984, this lake was named by a group of researchers around A. Lavenu. Other ancient lakes on the Altiplano are Lake Mataro, Lake Ballivian, Lake Minchin and Lake Tauca. An erosion surface at  elevation and associated clays were formerly attributed with Ballivián but today shorelines at that elevation are instead associated with Cabana.

The lake existed about 1 million years ago. It was preceded by Lake Mataro and succeeded by Lake Escara and Lake Ballivian, the latter in the north and the former in the south. A phase of tectonic extension in the Titicaca basin may have favoured the formation of this lake. The existence of this lake may have facilitated the diversification of Heleobia snails, but increased speciation only occurred during the subsequent Ballivian episode.

References

Sources 

 
 

Geology of Bolivia
Former lakes of South America
Lakes of Bolivia
Pleistocene
Lakes of Peru
Geology of Peru